Rowena is an unincorporated community in southwestern Runnels County, Texas, United States. According to the US Census, the population was estimated at 483 in 2000, an increase of 3% from the 1990 census (466 Rowenans). The United States Postal Service now estimates the population at 714. The elevation is 1,628 feet above sea level.

History
Paul J. Baron designed the town in 1898.

Notable person
 Bonnie Parker, born in Rowena, was an outlaw who traveled the Central United States during the Great Depression in the early 1930s.

References 

Unincorporated communities in Texas
Unincorporated communities in Runnels County, Texas